At the 2011 Pan Arab Games, the weightlifting events were held at Al Dana Hall in Doha, Qatar from 13–17 December. A total of 12 events were contested.

Medal summary

Men

Women

Doping

One athlete from Weightlifting was caught using performance-enhancing drugs.  Silver medalist Ayecha Albalooshi from United Arab Emirates who participated in Women's -58 kg was caught and stripped of her medal.  The bronze medalist has since been upgraded to silver, however as all of the other participants weren't able to finish the event no one has been upgraded to bronze.

Medal table

References

External links
Weightlifting at official website

Pan Arab Games
Events at the 2011 Pan Arab Games
2011 Pan Arab Games